The Lagos State Ministry of Education is a state government owned ministry charged with the responsibility of planning  and implementing the state policies on Education.

Folashade Adefisayo is the current Lagos state commissioner of Education. She assumed office in 2019.

Vision 
To become Africa's paradigm for educational excellence.

Mission 
To make high-quality education available to all learners through effective and efficient resource management, resulting in self-sufficiency and socioeconomic growth.

Objective 
To provide enriched educational experience for students in schools. This is done by  the provision of quality standards, pedagogy excellence, appropriate teaching methods or approaches, learning resources and instructional materials. These materials  are all important factors that guarantee high-quality education, leading to stimulating learning experience and excellent performance. Appropriate teaching methods or approaches, learning resources and instructional materials that are all indispensable ingredients that guarantee high-quality education leading to stimulating learning experience and excellent performance.

Goals 
The Ministry of Education aims to positively influence and reshape the state's current educational system in order to improve capacity and performance outcomes by redirecting and optimizing resources, designing effective policies, and establishing time lines in order to maximize educational excellence and gradually move towards the desired quality education standards.

See also
Lagos State Ministry of Transport
Lagos State Executive Council
Lagos State Ministry of Housing

References

Education in Lagos State
Government ministries of Lagos State